Hurricane Madeline was the first of two tropical cyclones that threatened to make a landfall on Hawaii as a hurricane in 2016, the other being Hurricane Lester. The fourteenth named storm, eighth hurricane and fifth major hurricane of the 2016 Pacific hurricane season, Madeline developed out of an area of low pressure that formed well to the south-southwest of Baja California. By August 26, the disturbance developed to a tropical depression, before becoming a tropical storm shortly afterwards. Wind shear initially inhibited development, however as the cyclone turned northwest, Madeline underwent rapid intensification as an eye feature developed within the storm on August 29. Madeline ultimately peaked as a Category 4 major hurricane the next day. The hurricane then began to weaken as wind shear began to increase as it approached Hawaii. By September 1, Madeline weakened to a tropical storm and passed just south of the Big Island of Hawaii, dumping heavy rainfall, surf, and gusty winds to the island. The cyclone eventually degenerated into a remnant low on September 2 before dissipating later that day.

In advance of both Madeline and Lester to its east, the state of Hawaii began to prepare for a potentially historic strike, possibly two, as the hurricanes approached. Hurricane warnings were issued for the Big Island in preparation for the imminent landfall. As Madeline approached, somewhat weaker than expected, a state of emergency was declared for the entire state of Hawaii still, with dozens of emergency shelters opening on the Big Island. Public schools were closed through September 1 due to the hurricane, and officials advised to stay off any roads and remain indoors if possible. Madeline brought less damage then expected, mainly due to its southward jog and missing the state as a tropical storm, however, areas of Hawaii still experienced heavy rainfall, flooding, storm surge and gusty winds at times.

Meteorological history 

Over the next few days, the disturbance gradually organized as it tracked westward across the Pacific. Convective banding features formed to the west of the cyclone, and the depression was later upgraded to Tropical Storm Madeline at 00:00 UTC on August 27. Moving northwestwards under the influence of being located at the southwestern periphery of a mid-level ridge, Madeline strengthened slowly in an environment of moderate wind shear, before crossing 140°W and entering the Central Pacific basin at 00:00 UTC on August 28, at which point the power of issuing advisories on tropical cyclone was transferred to the Central Pacific Hurricane Center.

Once in the Central Pacific, Madeline changed little in intensity until 03:00 UTC on August 29, at which point Madeline began to undergo a period of rapid intensification as an eye feature developed in an organizing central dense overcast (CDO), and it was upgraded to a hurricane at 09:00 UTC that day. By later that day, however, the cloud presentation of Madeline began to degrade as wind shear increased slightly due to an upper-level trough that was located near Hawaii, and by mid-day on August 30, as shown by an Air Force reconnaissance aircraft, the hurricane fell below major hurricane intensity by early on August 31 as it approached Hawaii. Further weakening occurred and six hours later it had weakened to a Category 1 hurricane. The eye later disappeared from satellite and reconnaissance data indicated that the low and mid-level centers were beginning to become elongated. Later that day, the circulation became exposed from the convection as wind shear continued to impact the cyclone, and it eventually weakened to a tropical storm by early on September 1. The deepest convection was pushed to the northeast of the center. Despite favorable sea surface temperatures, the wind shear continued to take its toll on Madeline, and although a new burst of convection over the center flared, the tropical storm continued to further deteriorate in structure. Eventually, by late on September 2, Madeline opened up into a trough of low pressure south-southwest of Hawaii.

Preparations and impact 

As Madeline rapid intensified on August 29, posing a great threat to Hawaii, a hurricane watch was issued for Hawaii County. A tropical storm warning and a tropical storm watch was issued for Hawaii County and Maui County respectively on the next day as Madeline moved closer to Hawaii. The CPHC issued a hurricane warning for Hawaii County later that day, the first since Iselle in 2014. The watches in Maui County was modified to tropical storm warning on August 31. The hurricane warning was lowered to tropical storm warning later that day as Madeline weakened and failed to make a landfall in the state. All warnings were discontinued on September 1 as Madeline weakened and moved away from the islands.

Governor of Hawaii David Ige declared a state of emergency on August 30 as Madeline approached, subsequently citing that an emergency relief period be in effect from August 31 to September 9, in preparation of a possible impact from Hurricane Lester. More than a dozen emergency shelters were opened by the American Red Cross of Hawaii to offer food, water and other essential supplies. All public schools were closed on the Big Island through September 1 as Madeline approached. Residents were also strongly advised to stay inside during the storm. The Umauma Bridge (Route 19) was closed in both directions in anticipation of high winds impacting the bridge.

Although Madeline did affect the Big Island, it did not make the major landfall that was anticipated by some meteorologists. Instead, a southwards jog of the system caused much less impacts then what were actually anticipated. Still, Madeline produced heavy rain and gusty winds on the Big Island. A few low-lying, flood-prone roads in Hilo were inundated briefly but no significant damages were reported.

See also 

Weather of 2016
Tropical cyclones in 2016
List of Category 4 Pacific hurricanes
List of Hawaii hurricanes
Hurricane Kenneth (2005)
Hurricane Iselle (2014)
Hurricane Darby (2016)

References 

Category 4 Pacific hurricanes
2016 in Hawaii
Hurricanes in Hawaii
August 2016 events in Oceania
September 2016 events in the United States
2016 Pacific hurricane season
Madeline